Perumugai is a panchayat village in Gobichettipalayam taluk in Erode District of Tamil Nadu state, India. The village is located on the road connecting Gobichettipalayam with Athani via Kallipatti. Perumugai has a population of 8,692.

References

Villages in Erode district